Chen Yuekun (born 30 October 1990) is a Chinese badminton player, winner of the Macau and Vietnam opens.

Achievements

BWF Grand Prix 
The BWF Grand Prix had two levels, the Grand Prix and Grand Prix Gold. It was a series of badminton tournaments sanctioned by the Badminton World Federation (BWF) and played between 2007 and 2017.

Men's singles

  BWF Grand Prix Gold tournament
  BWF Grand Prix tournament

References

External links 
 

1990 births
Living people
Badminton players from Wuhan
Chinese male badminton players